|}

This is a list of House of Assembly results for the 1973 South Australian state election.

Results by electoral district

Adelaide

Albert Park

Alexandra

Ascot Park

Bragg

Brighton

Chaffey

Coles

Davenport

Elizabeth

Eyre

Fisher

Flinders

Florey

Frome

Gilles

Glenelg

Gouger

Goyder

Hanson

Henley Beach

Heysen

Kavel

Light

Mallee

Mawson

Millicent

Mitcham

Mitchell

Mount Gambier

Murray

Norwood

Peake

Pirie

Playford

Price

Rocky River

Ross Smith

Salisbury

Semaphore

Spence

Stuart

Tea Tree Gully

Torrens

Unley

Victoria

Whyalla

See also
 Members of the South Australian House of Assembly, 1973–1975

References

1973
1973 elections in Australia
1970s in South Australia